CYOA may refer to:

 Ekati Airport (ICAO code: CYOA), a Canadian airport at the Ekati Diamond Mine
 Gamebook (also Choose Your Own Adventure), a work of printed fiction that allows the reader to participate in the story